Prunus insititia may refer to:
The species Prunus domestica, commonly referred as European plum
Damson, a subspecies of Prunus domestica, also known as Prunus domestica subsp. insititia, or sometimes Prunus insititia